Professor Gunnar Svedberg (born 12 August 1947 in Annefors, Bollnäs Municipality) was the Rector of the University of Gothenburg, in Sweden.

Svedberg studied at the Royal Institute of Technology (KTH) in Stockholm and received a PhD in chemical engineering in 1975. He became a full professor at the KTH in 1989. He was the Rector (corresponding to Vice-Chancellor or President) of Mid Sweden University College from 1999 to 2003, and of the University of Gothenburg between July 2003 and September 2006. He was President of Innventia, until his retirement in June 2011.
 
Svedberg has been a member of the Royal Swedish Academy of Engineering Sciences since 1992.

References

|-

|-

1947 births
Living people
People from Bollnäs Municipality
Academic staff of the University of Gothenburg
Swedish chemists
Swedish engineers
KTH Royal Institute of Technology alumni
Rectors of Mid Sweden University
Rectors of the University of Gothenburg
Members of the Royal Swedish Academy of Engineering Sciences